CinemaScore is a market research firm based in Las Vegas. It surveys film audiences to rate their viewing experiences with letter grades, reports the results, and forecasts box office receipts based on the data.

Background
Ed Mintz founded CinemaScore in 1979 after disliking The Cheap Detective despite being a fan of Neil Simon, and hearing another disappointed attendee wanting to hear the opinions of ordinary people instead of critics. A Yom Kippur donation card with tabs inspired the survey cards given to audience members. The company conducts surveys to audiences who have seen a film in theaters, asking them to rate the film and specifying what drew them to the film. Its results are published in Entertainment Weekly. CinemaScore also conducts surveys to determine audience interest in renting films on video, breaking the demographic down by age and sex and passing along information to video companies such as Fox Video Corporation.

CinemaScore pollster Dede Gilmore reported the trend in 1993, "Most movies get easily a B-plus. I think people come wanting the entertainment. They have high expectations. They're more lenient with their grades. But as (moviegoers) do it more and more, they get to be stronger critics". In 1993, films that were graded with an A included Scent of a Woman, A Few Good Men and Falling Down. Films graded with a B included Sommersby and Untamed Heart. A C-grade film for the year was Body of Evidence.

CinemaScore at first reported its findings to consumers, including a newspaper column and a radio show. After 20th Century Fox approached the company in 1989, it began selling the data to studios instead. A website was launched by CinemaScore in 1999, after three years' delay in which the president sought sponsorship from magazines and video companies. Brad Peppard was president of CinemaScore Online from 1999 to 2002. The website included a database of nearly 2,000 feature films and the audiences' reactions to them. Prior to the launch, CinemaScore results had been published in Las Vegas Review-Journal and Reno Gazette-Journal. CinemaScore's expansion to the Internet included a weekly email subscription for cinephiles to keep up with reports of audience reactions.

In 1999, CinemaScore was rating approximately 140 films a year, including 98–99% of major studio releases. For each film, employees polled 400–500 moviegoers in three of CinemaScore's 15 sites, which included the cities Las Vegas, Los Angeles, San Diego, Denver, Milwaukee, St. Louis, Dallas, Atlanta, Tampa, Phoenix, and Coral Springs.

In the summer of 2002, CinemaScore reported that the season had the biggest collective grade since 1995. In the summer of 2000, 25 out of 32 films received either an A or B grade. Twenty-six of the summer of 2001's 30 films got similar grades, while 32 of the summer of 2002's 34 films got similar grades, the latter being the highest ratio in a decade.

Since July 2014, CinemaScore reports its results also on Twitter, and from January 16, 2016, it began with Collateral Beauty to use for each of them an image with the movie poster on the left and the grade obtained on the right.

Usually, to maintain comparable sample sizes, only films that open in more than 1,500 screens are polled and reported on CinemaScore's website and social media. The distributor of a film that opens in fewer screens can also contract with CinemaScore for a private survey, whose result would be disclosed only to the client. Some of these privately-contracted surveys' results have nevertheless been publicly touted, such as the "A+" ratings for films including Courageous and A Question of Faith (both released by faith-based distributer Pure Flix Entertainment).

Rating

CinemaScore describes itself as "the industry leader in measuring movie appeal". There are 35 to 45 teams of CinemaScore representatives present in 25 large cities across North America. Each Friday, representatives in five randomly chosen cities give opening-day audiences a small survey card. The card asks for age, gender, a grade for the film ("A", "B", "C", "D" or "F"), whether they would rent or buy the film on DVD or Blu-ray, why they chose the film and whether or not they felt the film lined up with its marketing. CinemaScore typically receives about 400 cards per film; the company estimates a 65% response rate and 6% margin of error.

An overall grade of "A+" and "F" is calculated as the average of the grades given by responders. In this case, grades other than "F" are qualified with a plus (high end), minus (low end) or neither (middle). The ratings are divided by gender and age groups (under 21, 21–34, 35 and up). Film studios and other subscribers receive the data at about 11 pm Pacific Time. CinemaScore publishes letter grades to the public on social media and, although the detailed data is proprietary, the grades become widely shared in the media and the industry. Subsequent advertisements for highly ranked films often cite their CinemaScore grades.

As opening-night audiences are presumably more enthusiastic about a film than ordinary patrons, a "C" grade from them is – according to the Los Angeles Times – "bad news, the equivalent of a failing grade". According to Ed Mintz, "A's generally are good, B's generally are shaky, and C's are terrible. D's and F's, they shouldn't have made the movie, or they promoted it funny and the absolute wrong crowd got into it". Horror films consistently score lower; The Conjurings "A−" was the first time a horror film scored better than "B+". CinemaScore's Harold Mintz said that "An F in a horror film is equivalent to a B− in a comedy".

An "A+" typically predicts a successful box office. From 1982 to August 2011, only 52 films (about two a year) received the top grade, including seven Academy Award for Best Picture winners. From 2000 to January 2020, there were 53 movies with "A+". , about 90 films have received "A+".

From 2004 to 2014, those rated "A+" and "A" had multiples of 4.8 and 3.6, respectively, while C-rated films' total revenue was 2.5 times their opening weekend. Ed Mintz cited Leonardo DiCaprio and Tom Cruise as the "two stars, it doesn't matter how bad the film is, they can pull (the projections) up". (DiCaprio's Shutter Island had a 3.1 revenue multiple despite a "C+" grade, and Cruise's Vanilla Sky had a 4 multiple with a "D" grade.)

, 22 films have received an "F" grade. Vulture wrote that besides horror,

Vulture cited as examples of such F-graded films Steven Soderbergh's Solaris with George Clooney, Andrew Dominik's Killing Them Softly with Brad Pitt, and Darren Aronofsky's mother! with Jennifer Lawrence.

In an essay for The Hollywood Reporter, Martin Scorsese strongly criticized this type of approach by writing: "The brutal judgmentalism that has made opening-weekend grosses into a bloodthirsty spectator sport seems to have encouraged an even more brutal approach to film reviewing. I'm talking about market research firms like CinemaScore [...]. They have everything to do with the movie business and absolutely nothing to do with either the creation or the intelligent viewing of film. The filmmaker is reduced to a content manufacturer and the viewer to an unadventurous consumer." Mintz rejected being lumped in with Rotten Tomatoes, and defended their methodology of polling select audiences on the opening night, to see if the film meets the expectations of the people who most want to see it, and further defended the accuracy of their data and the correlation to box office results.

CinemaScore's forecasts for box-office receipts based on the surveys are, according to the Los Angeles Times, "surprisingly accurate" as "most of [the company's] picks...are in the ballpark", in 2009 correctly predicting the success of The Hangover and the failure of Land of the Lost. Hollywood executives are divided on CinemaScore's accuracy. One told Deadline Hollywood "It's not always right, but it's a pretty good indicator. I rely on it", while another said that competitor PostTrak was "much better...more thorough and in-depth".

List of "A+" films

As of 2023, only Jon Erwin has made the list four times: thrice with his brother (2015, 2018, and 2021) and once with Brent McCorkle (2023). Three directors have made the list three times: Rob Reiner (1987, 1989, 1992), Alex Kendrick (2011, 2015, 2019), and Andrew Erwin (2015, 2018, 2021). The following directors have appeared on the list twice: Steven Spielberg (1982, 1993), James Cameron (1991, 1997), Robert Zemeckis (1994, 2004), Pete Docter (2001, 2009), Malcolm D. Lee (2013, 2017), Peter Berg (2013, 2016), Brad Bird (2004, 2018), and George Tillman Jr. (1997, 2018).

List of "F" films

References

External links
 

Film organizations in the United States
Market research companies of the United States